Strangers Again is a 2023 South Korean television series starring Kang So-ra and Jang Seung-jo. It is about the love and growth of divorce lawyers, to whom divorce is easy but separation is difficult. The series is an original drama of Genie TV, and is available for streaming on its platform, and on Viki in selected regions. It also aired from January 18 to February 22, 2023, on ENA's Wednesdays and Thursdays at 21:00 (KST) time slot.

Synopsis
The series follows the story of Oh Ha-ra (Kang So-ra), a star divorce lawyer who is called the goddess of litigation, and her ex-husband Goo Eun-beom (Jang Seung-jo) who is also a talented lawyer. The two live as complete strangers after divorce, and reunite at the same law firm as colleagues.

Cast

Main
 Kang So-ra as Oh Ha-ra
 Jang Seung-jo as Goo Eun-beom

Supporting
 Jo Eun-ji as Kang Bi-chwi
 Lee Jae-won as Kwon Si-wook
 Jeon Bae-soo as Seo Han-gil
 Gil Hae-yeon as Hong Yeo-rae
 Moo Jin-sung as Min Jae-gyeom

Extended
 Park Jeong-won as Ki Seo-hee
 Kim Ro-sa as Jeon Min-kyung
 Shin Joo-hyeop as Sung Chan-young
 Min Chae-min as Ji Ye-seul
 Park Yong-woo as Han Do-woon
 Hwang Ji-ah as Laura

Special appearances
 Jeong Yu-mi as Na Soo-yeon
 Kim Ha-kyung as Mi-hyang

Viewership

References

External links
  
 
 
 

Korean-language television shows
ENA television dramas
South Korean legal television series
South Korean romance television series
2023 South Korean television series debuts
2023 South Korean television series endings